Darreh Hendian (also Romanized as Darreh Hendīān, Darreh Hendīyān, and Darreh-ye Hendīān) is a village in Chamsangar Rural District, Papi District, Khorramabad County, Lorestan Province, Iran. At the 2006 census, its population was 102, in 21 families.

References 

Towns and villages in Khorramabad County